1351 is a number in the 1000s number range.

1351 or variant, may also refer to:

 AD 1351 (MCCCLI), the 1351st year in the Common Era
 1351 BC, the year before the common era
 1351 Uzbekistania, asteroid #1351, the 1351st asteroid registered
 Commodore 1351, model 1351 computer mouse from Commodore Business Machines
 United Nations Security Council Resolution 1351

See also

 B.1.351, a variant of COVID-19 virus SARS-CoV-2 first detected in South Africa
 10.1351, DOI prefix for chemistry